Sydney Wigham Smith (c. 1866 – 14 December 1933) was an architect in Melbourne, Australia, principal of the firm of Sydney Smith, Ogg and Serpell.

History
Smith was a son of Sarah Ann Smith, née Carter, and Sydney William Smith (died June 1886), the first engineer of the St Kilda Road Board, founding his own architectural practice in 1852.

On the death of his father, Smith took over his business, and was joined in partnership by Charles Alfred Ogg in 1891 and Charles Edward Serpell in 1921.
Notable buildings designed by the firm include:
C. M. Read Stores, Chapel Street Prahran;
Citv Club Hotel, Collins Street;
Colonial Mutual Insurance offices, Collins Street;
Harley House, Collins Street;
John Danks & Son in Bourke Street;
London Inn, Market Street;
Oriental Hotel, Collins Street;
Port Authority building in Market Street, for which they were awarded a Royal Victorian Institute of Architects medal in 1933;
several branch offices of the State Savings Bank;
Union Steamship Co. William Street;
Victoria Buildings, Collins Street;
Mitcham Post Office, Mitcham Victoria (for Patrick J. Markham, 1923)[Architect's drawings held by Whitehorse Historical Society; available on line via Victorian Collections]

Other interests
Smith was 
a member of the Australian and Yorick Clubs and of the Royal Melbourne Golf Club. 
honorary architect to the Melbourne Orphanage
honorary architect to the Melbourne Athenaeum and made an honorary life member after his conversion of the old Athenaeum Hall into a theatre.
a director of the Royal Humane Society of Australasia
a member of the Armadale Bowling Club and of the team which won the Australian championship in Brisbane in 1914.
a champion billiard player, as "Toorak" winning the Victoria Club tournament.
the first secretary of the St Kilda Football Club.

Family 
Smith married Maude Eleanor Wood ( – 6 January 1931) on 22 May 1891, and had a home at 1 Erskine Street, Malvern, Victoria. 
Their only daughter Dorothy "Doff" Smith (died 12 January 1934) married Harold Bloom Cowles on 16 February 1921.

Smith was a brother of (Anglican) Rev. Godfrey Hull Smith (c. 1859 – 28 June 1938), curate of St Philip's Church, Sydney and vicar at Ivanhoe; Herbert Henry Smith M.L.C. (died 1935), and Clifford J. Smith, of Armadale, Victoria.
Sisters were Clare Elizabeth Smith, who married Charles Englebert Propsting in 1917; Sadie Smith, who married Charles Forbes in 1914; K. H. Smith and A. E. Smith.

References 

1866 births
1933 deaths
Victorian (Australia) architects